The Walsh Stable is a historic building located at 1523 22nd Street, NW in the Dupont Circle neighborhood of Washington, D.C. It was designed by architect Lemuel Norris in 1903 and added to the National Register of Historic Places in 1986.

See also
 Codman Carriage House and Stable
 Spencer Carriage House and Stable

References

External links

Barns on the National Register of Historic Places in Washington, D.C.
Dupont Circle
Buildings and structures completed in 1903
1903 establishments in Washington, D.C.